Lot 49 may refer to:

The Crying of Lot 49, a novel by Thomas Pynchon
Lot 49, Prince Edward Island, a township in Canada